Bloody show is the passage of a small amount of blood or blood-tinged mucus through the vagina near the end of pregnancy. It is caused by the detachment of the cervical mucus plug that seals the cervix during pregnancy, and is one of the signs that labor may be imminent. Although the bloody show is a common and harmless cause of bleeding in late pregnancy, there are many other possible causes for vaginal bleeding, some of which may indicate serious medical problems such as miscarriage or placental abruption, and vaginal bleeding should not be ignored as a possible sign of serious complications.

See also
 Antepartum hemorrhage
 Obstetrical hemorrhage

References

Obstetrics
Health issues in pregnancy
Midwifery